Atthege Thakka Sose is a 1979 Indian Kannada-language film, directed by Y. R. Swamy and produced by S. D. Ankalagi, B. H. Chandannavar, Surendra Ingale and M. G. Hublikar. The film stars Maanu, Rekha Rao, Gangadhar and Srilalitha. The film has musical score by M. Ranga Rao.

Cast

Maanu
Rekha Rao
Gangadhar
Srilalitha
Leelavathi
Pramila Joshai
Kamini Bhatiya
Dheerendra Gopal
B. K. Shankar
Sadashiva Brahmavar
Kumaraswamy
Hanumanthachar
Malkoji Rao
Chandannavar
Surendra Ingale
Hanumantha Biradar
Jr. Narasimharaju
Master Rajesh
Master Ganesh
Rekha Mavinakurve
Lalithamma
Umasarathi
Vanajakshi

Soundtrack
The music was composed by M. Ranga Rao.

References

1979 films
1970s Kannada-language films
Films scored by M. Ranga Rao
Films directed by Y. R. Swamy